Faxonius limosus, synonym Orconectes limosus, is a species of crayfish in the family Cambaridae. It is native to the east coast of North America, from Quebec to the lower James River, Virginia, but has also been introduced to Europe.

It is unusual in that it lives in silty streams, rather than the clear water usually preferred by crayfish. Like Pacifastacus leniusculus, another invasive North American crayfish, F. limosus carries crayfish plague and is a threat to native European crayfish.

F. limosus was introduced to Germany in 1890, and has since spread across much of Northern Europe, recently reaching the United Kingdom. It has also spread southwards as far as the Danube in Serbia.

In Europe, F. limosus is included since 2016 in the list of Invasive Alien Species of Union concern (the Union list). This implies that this species cannot be imported, bred, transported, commercialized, or intentionally released into the environment in the whole of the European Union.

Faxonius limosus can reproduce sexually or by parthenogenesis. Lobsters and crayfish are decapods meaning that they have 10 legs. 2 of them are claws.  These crayfish live on the bottom of the freshwater pools, such as lakes, ponds and swamps. They prefer flat, sandy, and rocky floors. They are also found outside the water on beaches or lawns near the pool of water. They use rocks to make burrows while in the water. This is a very common species of crayfish, especially on Northeast United States, and Southeast Canada.

References 

Cambaridae
Freshwater crustaceans of North America
Crustaceans described in 1817
Taxa named by Constantine Samuel Rafinesque
Edible crustaceans
Taxobox binomials not recognized by IUCN